Brill is a German and English surname. Notable people with the surname include:

Artists
 John Frederick Brill (died 1942), British World War II soldier and mural artist
 Matthijs Brill, and Paul Brill, 16th century Flemish landscape painters
 Slavko Brill (1900–1943), Croatian sculptor

Athletes
 Dean Brill (born 1985), English footballer
 Debbie Brill (born 1953), Canadian high-jumper
 Frank Brill (1864–1944), American bowler and baseball player
 Karl Brill, American football player
 Martin Brill (born 1956), New Zealand fencer
 Marty Brill (American football) (1906–1973), football coach
 Sam Brill (born 1985), American soccer player

Businesspeople
 E. J. Brill, founder of Brill Publishers (Leiden)
 J. G. Brill, founder of J. G. Brill and Company
 Ron Brill, American businessman and co-founder of Home Depot

Educators
 Ann Brill, Dean of the School of Journalism at Kansas University
 Ralph Brill (born 1935), Professor of Law at Chicago-Kent College of Law

Musicians
 Karsten Brill, German singer better known as Attila Dorn
 Logan Brill, American singer
 Shirley Brill, Israeli clarinetist

Performers
 Charlie Brill (born 1938), American actor
 Eddie Brill, American comedian, writer, and actor
 Fran Brill (born 1946), American voice actress and puppeteer, worked on Sesame Street
 Lindy Brill (born 1963), British actress
 Marty Brill (comedian) (born 1932), American comedian

Politicians
 Arthur Brill, German politician during the 1920s and 1930s 
 Barry Brill (born 1940), New Zealand politician
 Hermann Brill (1895–1959), German politician who opposed the rise of Nazism
 Julie Brill, commissioner of the Federal Trade Commission

Scientists
 Abraham Brill (1874–1948), Austrian-born American psychiatrist
 Alexander von Brill (1842–1935), German mathematician
 Eric Brill, computer scientist
 Henry Brill (1906–1990), American psychiatrist
 Nathan Edwin Brill (1860–1925), American physician
 Robert H. Brill, American archaeologist and chemist
 Steve Brill, American naturalist
 Yvonne Brill (1924–2013), Canadian rocket scientist

Writers
 Bill Brill (1931–2011), American sportswriter
 Paul Brill, American composer, songwriter, and producer
 Steven Brill (journalist) (born 1950), founder of American Lawyer magazine and other information services
 Steven Brill (filmmaker) (born 1962), American film director, screenwriter, producer and actor
 William H. Brill (1871–1923), American journalist

Others
 Angel Kreiman Brill (1945–2014), Chief Rabbi of Chile
 David Brill (cinematographer) (born 1944), Australian journalist
 David P. Brill (1955–1979), American gay rights advocate
 Kurt Brill (1916–1978), Wehrmacht officer
 Samuel Löw Brill (1814–1897), Hungarian rabbi
 William Brill (RAAF officer) (1916–1964), Australian military pilot

References